Gregg Brown (born 20 December 1972) is an English cricketer.  Brown is a right-handed batsman who bowls right-arm medium pace.  He was born at Bath, Somerset.

Brown represented the Somerset Cricket Board in a single List A match against Bedfordshire in the 2nd round of the 1999 NatWest Trophy. In his only List A match, he scored 3 runs and took a single catch.

References

External links
Gregg Brown at Cricinfo
Gregg Brown at CricketArchive

1972 births
Living people
Sportspeople from Bath, Somerset
English cricketers
Somerset Cricket Board cricketers